Peridea angulosa, the angulose prominent, is a moth of the family Notodontidae. The species was first described by James Edward Smith in 1797. Its range consists of southern Canada, south to Florida and west to Texas.

The wingspan is 35–45 mm. Adults are on wing from May to August.

The larvae feed on Quercus species.

External links

Notodontidae
Moths of North America
Moths described in 1797